The Irregular at Magic High School is an anime adaptation of a light novel series written by Tsutomu Satō. At the "Dengeki Bunko Aki no Namahōsō Festival" event on October 6, 2019, a second season of the anime series was announced and originally scheduled to air in July 2020, adapting the "Visitor Arc" in the novel series, but it has been delayed to October 4, 2020 due to the COVID-19 pandemic. The main staff and cast from the 2017 film are reprising their roles in the second season. Aniplex of America announced its acquisition the anime series, and originally announced that Funimation would stream it exclusively, but Hulu ended up streaming the series as well. On November 13, 2020, Funimation announced that the second season of the series would receive an English dub.

With the release of the eleventh episode of the series, the timeline of the 2017 anime film The Irregular at Magic High School: The Movie – The Girl Who Summons the Stars was revealed to be taking place during its commercial break.



Episode list

References

2020 Japanese television seasons
The Irregular at Magic High School episode lists
Anime postponed due to the COVID-19 pandemic